is a Japanese former football player and currently manager of former team Tiamo Hirakata.

Club career
Futagawa was born in Kagoshima Prefecture on 27 June 1980. He joined J1 League club Gamba Osaka from youth team in 1999. He debuted in 1999 season and played many matches as offensive midfielder from 2000 season. He played as central player for the club for a long time. In 2003, he was given number "10" shirt and Gamba was at the 3rd place in J1 League. In 2005, Gamba won the champions in J1 League first time in the club history. In 2008, Gamba won the champions in AFC Champions League for 2 years in a row as Japanese club (Urawa Reds won in 2007). Gamba also won the Emperor's Cup. In 2009, Gamba won the Emperor's Cup for 2 years in a row. This is the golden era in the club history and he was one of the central player under manager Akira Nishino (2002–2011).

However manager Nishino left Gamba end of 2011 season and the club performance deteriorated soon. In 2012, Gamba finished at the 17th place of 18 clubs and was relegated to J2 League. Futagawa remained in Gamba and Gamba won the champions in 2013 season. In 2014 season, Gamba returned to J1 and won all three major title in Japan, J1 League, J.League Cup and Emperor's Cup. However his opportunity to play decreased in 2014 and he could hardly play in the match from 2015.

In June 2016, Futagawa moved to J2 club Tokyo Verdy. He played many matches in 2016 season. However he could hardly play in the match from 2017. In March 2018, he moved to Tochigi SC. In 2019, he moved to Regional Leagues club FC Tiamo Hirakata.

In 2022, Futagawa retirement from football after 23 years as professional career have been end.

International career
On 4 August 2006, he debuted for Japan national team against Ghana.

Managerial career
On 20 November 2022, Futagawa appointment manager of JFL club, Tiamo Hirakata for upcoming 2023 season after retirement from football player in 2022 season.

Career statistics

Club

1 = Japanese Super Cup and Suruga Bank Championship appearances.

FIFA Club World Cup Career Statistics

International

Managerial statistics
.

Honours
AFC Champions League: 2008
Pan-Pacific Championship: 2008
J1 League: 2005, 2014
J2 League: 2013
Emperor's Cup: 2008, 2009, 2014, 2015
J.League Cup: 2007, 2014
Japanese Super Cup: 2007

References

External links
Profile at Tochigi SC

Japan National Football Team Database

1980 births
Living people
Association football people from Kagoshima Prefecture
Japanese footballers
Japan international footballers
Japanese football managers
J1 League players
J2 League players
J3 League players
Gamba Osaka players
Gamba Osaka U-23 players
Tokyo Verdy players
Tochigi SC players
FC Tiamo Hirakata players
Association football midfielders